Eucalyptus argutifolia, commonly known as Wabling Hill mallee or Yanchep mallee, is a mallee that is endemic to the south-west of Western Australia. It is a rare species with smooth bark, lance-shaped adult leaves, flower buds arranged in groups of seven or nine, white flowers and cylindrical to conical cup-shaped fruit.

Description
The adult leaves are the same glossy green on both sides. Leaves intermediate between juvenile and adult are also usually present.

Taxonomy
Eucalyptus argutifolia was first formally described in 1992 by Peter Grayling and Ian Brooker from a specimen that was collected at Parrot Ridge near Yanchep in 1987. The description was published in the journal Nuytsia. The specific epithet (argutifolia) is derived from the Latin words argutus meaning "clear", "bright" or "sharp" and folium meaning "leaf", referring to the shiny adult leaves of this species.

It is placed in the Eucalyptus sub-genus Symphyomyrtus, section Dumaria, series Rufispermae.

Distribution and habitat
Wabling Hill mallee occurs naturally on Wabling Hill and Parrot Ridge to the north of Yanchep and to the south of Seabird on shallow soils of limestone ridges, on slopes and in gullies.

Conservation
This eucalypt is classified as "vulnerable" under the Australian Government Environment Protection and Biodiversity Conservation Act 1999 and as "Threatened Flora (Declared Rare Flora — Extant)" by the Department of Environment and Conservation (Western Australia). The main threats to the species include mining activities, inappropriate fire regimes, grazing and weed invasion.

See also
List of Eucalyptus species

References

Eucalypts of Western Australia
argutifolia
Myrtales of Australia
Vulnerable flora of Australia
Mallees (habit)
Plants described in 1992
Taxa named by Ian Brooker